The Charles Boles House, located at 40 Appleway Dr. in Kalispell, Montana, United States, is a Tudor Revival-style house builtin 1932.  It was listed on the National Register of Historic Places in 2006.

It has also been known as the Jack and LeEtta Carver Residence and as the United Way Building.

It was designed by architect Fred Brinkman, who designed more than 80 residences, churches, and commercial buildings in Kalispell.

References

Houses on the National Register of Historic Places in Montana
Tudor Revival architecture in Montana
Houses completed in 1932
National Register of Historic Places in Flathead County, Montana
Houses in Flathead County, Montana
Kalispell, Montana
1932 establishments in Montana